I Am Nancy is a 2011 American documentary that follows actress Heather Langenkamp as she explores her role as Nancy Thompson in the A Nightmare on Elm Street films, the fandom that surrounds the franchise, and why most of it focuses on Freddy Krueger, rather than Nancy.

Plot 
Actress Heather Langenkamp attends several horror conventions across the globe as she interacts with fans to gain insight into why people are so drawn to the series and the characters of Nancy and Freddy. Additionally, she interviews Robert Englund and Wes Craven to understand what qualities make Nancy a definitive film hero.

Cast 
 Heather Langenkamp
 Robert Englund
 Wes Craven
 June Douglas
 Douglas Duart

Production 
Langenkamp was inspired to make a documentary about herself and Nancy after a receptionist rebuffed her efforts to contact director Wes Craven.  The film was originally planned to coincide with the 25th anniversary of A Nightmare on Elm Street but was delayed for her participation in Never Sleep Again.  Langenkamp felt that documentary did not answer all the questions that she had.  Production took two years.

Release 
I Am Nancy premiered at the Days of the Dead film festival.

Reception 
In a positive review for Dread Central, Emilie Noetzel wrote, "I Am Nancy is a must-see for fans of the A Nightmare on Elm Street series and of Heather Langenkamp. It is at times funny, at times quite serious, and oftentimes very touching. What really makes the documentary about Nancy, and Heather, feel so real and personal is that Heather understands the fact that Nancy is secondary to Freddy to most people, and she has no problem poking fun at herself."

References

External links 
 

2011 films
2011 documentary films
American documentary films
Documentary films about actors
Autobiographical documentary films
Direct-to-video documentary films
Documentary films about women
A Nightmare on Elm Street (franchise)
Documentary films about horror
2010s English-language films
2010s American films